Elaine Miller aka Gussie Grippers is a Scottish physiotherapist who is a comedian and women's health campaigner. Gussie has won awards at Edinburgh Festival Fringe and Fringe World, Australia. Miller is a Fellow of the Chartered Society of Physiotherapy. Both her physiotherapy and her comedy feature a specialism in Pelvic floor dysfunction.

Career 
While working as a physiotherapist in Scotland Miller developed a comedy show designed to engage audiences in understanding how physiotherapy can be used to tackle and prevent unrinary incontinence. She began her career in the field of sports physiotherapy, but after her own experience of becoming incontinent after having delivered three children, she began to focus on exercises for the pelvic floor. She is invited as a contributing expert on womens health topics in UK media, including BBC Women's Hour

Her show won 'Weirdest Show at the Fringe' at the Edinburgh festivals in 2013 and Comedy Award at Fringe World, Australia in 2020. Attendance is offered as continuing professional development (CPD) for a range of health professionals who hope to gain a better understanding of these issues, including  GPs, midwives, nurses, urologists, gynaecologists, health visitors and fitness professionals.  Her public engagement activities aim to use laughter as an essential health promotion tool, and are in the tradition of 'clown care' . Her comedy highlights the fact that laughing is one of the things which causes many women bladder leakage and the impact (and novelty) of her work is reflected in a range of health  and comedy-related media coverage.

She works to highlight a gap in women's health support  and get government funding for the  provision of physiotherapy to improve women’s health. She performs under the stage name Gussie Grippers. Her act often includes eyecatching costumes such as dressing up as a vulva and songs such as 'does your cervix hang low?'.

Activism 
Miller works to highlight issues in women's health. Stress urinary incontinence and pelvic organ prolapse are experienced by many women. Estimates suggest one in three, and that it is more prevalent in older women and women who have had babies.  Invasive operations to tackle incontinence involve the insertion of synthetic mesh. Urinary incontinence can be embarrassing and may impact your daily, family and social life. Miller believes the barriers which deter women from seeking help need to be explored and that raising awareness of the simple, repetitive, non-invasive pelvic floor exercises which can improve the condition, can have a significant impact on the day to day lives of many.

Controversy 
In 2022 she attracted mainstream media coverage when she wore, and flashed a merkin in the Scottish Parliament. Her protest was related to her view of the obscenity of the process of lawmaking. After an initial police investigation she was found not to have committed any crime.

Politics 
In 2023 she became an independent candidate for election in Edinburgh Corstorphine and Murrayfield and used her campaign in part to highlight issues of women's health provision in Edinburgh.

Performances 

 Gusset Grippers
 Viva your Vulva

References 

Women's health in the United Kingdom
Living people
Scottish women comedians
Physiotherapists
Year of birth missing (living people)
Place of birth missing (living people)
Activism
Maternal health
Women comedians
Vagina and vulva in art